La Bamba may refer to:

 La Bamba (film), a 1987 film based on the life and death of Ritchie Valens
 "La Bamba" (song), a folk song best known from a 1958 adaptation by Ritchie Valens
 La Bamba Mexican Restaurant, an American fast casual Tex-Mex restaurant chain
 Richie "LaBamba" Rosenberg, an American trombonist and singer

See also
 Bamba (disambiguation)
 La Bomba (disambiguation)